Sing Song is the title of the debut EP of the indie pop band The Little Ones.

In the United States, the EP was originally released with only 6 tracks, and then re-released with a bonus track on October 3, 2006.

In the United Kingdom, the EP was released as a "mini-album" on February 12, 2007, to coincide with the band's UK tour that started January 15, 2007. They supported The Boy Least Likely To, Tilly and the Wall, and The Magic Numbers.
The band were first championed in the UK by Planet Sound on Teletext, who gave Sing Song a 9/10 rating in the summer of 2006.

Track listing

Original release
"Let Them Ring the Bells"
"Lovers Who Uncover"
"Cha Cha Cha"
"High On a Hill"
"Oh, MJ!"
"Heavy Hearts Brigade"

Re-release
"Let Them Ring the Bells"
"Lovers Who Uncover"
"Cha Cha Cha"
"High On a Hill"
"Oh, MJ!"
"Face the Facts"
"Heavy Hearts Brigade"

References

External links 
Official Band Website

2006 debut EPs
The Little Ones (band) albums
Astralwerks EPs